Cnemidophorus gramivagus is a species of teiid lizard found in Venezuela, Colombia, and Brazil.

References

gramivagus
Reptiles described in 1987
Taxa named by Hugh K. McCrystal
Taxa named by James R. Dixon